Ajalon may refer to:

 Ajalon, a town and valley location in ancient Israel

See also 
 Ayalon (disambiguation)